Steve Travis is a retired singer-songwriter, musician, recording artist and author. He was born and raised in Colchester, Essex. His biggest selling albums are in the easy listening country style. More recently Steve Travis has been known for sea shanties including Billy O'Shea that debuted April 2021 on BBC Radio Essex with fellow musician and "Wellerman" creator Nathan Evans.

Musical career

Rock and pop; 1964–1979
Travis began his music career in the mid 1960s as a drummer in Colchester bands performing progressive rock. In 1970, he made a switch to guitar and vocals and formed the glam-rock band,  Plod. As a pop singer throughout the 1970s, he made many appearances alongside top acts including ELO, Genesis, Slade, Thin Lizzy, and Showaddywaddy. He then went on to form the hard rock band, The Perishers. They attracted the interest of London-based management company Deville Promotions and quickly booked time in Polydor Studios in London and recorded four demo tracks. These were original rock songs written by Travis. At that time Travis bore a likeness to Marc Bolan and his photograph appeared next to the late T. Rex frontman in national newspapers in 1979.

Country; 1981–2004
Travis moved on to country music issuing a single in 1982 entitled "Ghost Riders in the Sky" / "Moonlight on the Trail". This received excellent reviews in many of the music papers. For some years Travis retreated completely from the music business to concentrate on family life.

In 1991, Travis returned to performing country music and toured in the UK and Europe topping the bill at many CMC clubs, festivals and theatres. In 1994, he released his first CD album on the MJMusic record label, later signing a record deal with the Irish label Foam Records in 1997. His first album, 50 Country & Favourite Songs, a sing-along album in the style of Max Bygraves, sold over 100,000 copies and achieved a silver disc for sales.  Travis released a further 14 albums on the Foam label then continued his career with London-based Prism Leisure in 2003.

Contemporary; 2004–2010
In 2004, Travis composed and played keyboards on an album of relaxation music titled Healing Shores released on the Aquavision label. Following this an album of his narrated poetry set to music entitled Fragments of Desire was released on the Blue Water music label, taken from the book of the same name.

Sea shanties; 2010–present
With an increasing enthusiasm for sea shanties and inspiration from his longtime home by the sea in West Mersea there came a change of musical style. In 2012, H&H Music released Travis' first shanty album, Shanties and Other Ssongs of the Sea and a music video for his song "The Black Water Smuggler", reflects the history of the Blackwater Estuary. It was followed in 2016 by Sea Shanties and Pirate Songs.

In 2021 Travis created his first charity single to support a Horse & Animal rescue group in Tenerife where he now resides.

Album discography

Bibliography 
  As I recall it. 2005 Blue Water Music, 56 page book of humorous short stories
  A pirate’s Kiss.  2006 Blue Water Music, 36 page book of poems
  One man and his microphone. 2011 Memoirs.  Amusing fact and fiction          
  Fragments of Desire. 2013 A compilation of poems, lyrics and short stories     
  T’were rite funny. 2014 Comical short stories. 
  Dr Scrotum’s Sex facts for men and women.  2015 A compilation of vintage adverts and sex advice from the early 20th Century

References

External links 

1951 births
Living people
British country singers
British country guitarists
British rock drummers
British rock guitarists
British rock singers
British folk singers
Glam rock musicians
People from Colchester